Ryley Brendan Barnes (born 11 October 1993) is a Canadian volleyball player. He is a member of the Canada men's national volleyball team and Greek club PAOK Thessaloniki.

Career
Ryley Barnes began his post-secondary volleyball career with the Alberta Golden Bears in 2011. He went on to spend 5 years at the club, helping the team win back to back CIS championships in 2014 and 2015, in addition to being named CIS MVP for the 2013-14 season. In 2016, he signed with French team Tours VB.

National Team
Ryley first joined the national team program in 2012, helping the team win silver at the 2012 NORCECA U21 Championship and qualify for the 2013 FIVB U21 World Championship.

He joined the senior national team in 2017, being named to Canada's 2017 FIVB World League team.

Sporting achievements

College
 National championships
 2013/2014  CIS Championship, with Alberta Golden Bears
 2014/2015  CIS Championship, with Alberta Golden Bears
 2015/2016  CIS Championship, with Alberta Golden Bears

Clubs
 CEV Cup
  2016/2017 – with Tours VB

National team
 2012  NORCECA U21 Championship
 2016  Pan-American Cup
 2017  FIVB World League
 2019  NORCECA Champions Cup

Individually
 2014: CIS Championship – Tournament All-Stars (Most Valuable Player)
 2015: CIS Championship – Tournament All-Stars 
 2016: CIS Championship – Tournament All-Stars

References

External links
 
 
 Player profile at Volleybox.net
 2017 FIVB World League – Team Canada

1993 births
Living people
Sportspeople from Edmonton
Canadian men's volleyball players
Canadian expatriate sportspeople in France
Expatriate volleyball players in France
Canadian expatriate sportspeople in Russia
Expatriate volleyball players in Russia
Canadian expatriate sportspeople in Italy
Expatriate volleyball players in Italy
Ural Ufa volleyball players